Fairfield County Airport  is a public use airport in Fairfield County, Ohio, United States. It is located three nautical miles (6 km) northwest of the central business district of Lancaster, the county seat. The airport is owned by the Fairfield County Commissioners.

Although most U.S. airports use the same three-letter location identifier for the FAA and IATA, this airport is assigned LHQ by the FAA but has no designation from the IATA.

Facilities and aircraft 
It has one runway designated 10/28 with an asphalt surface measuring 5,004 by 75 feet (1,525 x 23 m).

For the 12-month period ending May 19, 2009, the airport had 43,066 aircraft operations, an average of 117 per day: 99.8% general aviation and 0.2% military. At that time there were 98 aircraft based at this airport: 85% single-engine, 7% multi-engine, 7% helicopter and 1% ultralight.

Currently there is one Standard Terminal Arrival (GUNNE ONE), an RNAV GPS approach in to runway 10 and 28, a localizer for 28 and a VOR or GPS-A circling approach.

Sundowner Aviation was the Fixed-Base Operator which provides fuel, maintenance, flight instruction, charter flights, hangars and tie-downs, Lasergrade testing, WSI aviation weather and car rental.

References

External links 
 Fairfield Air Ventures, the fixed-base operator (FBO)
 Aerial photo as of 8 April 1994 from USGS The National Map
 

County airports in Ohio
Buildings and structures in Fairfield County, Ohio
Transportation in Fairfield County, Ohio
1948 establishments in Ohio